Eunidia vittata is a species of beetle in the family Cerambycidae. It was described by Pic in 1932. It is known from Laos and Vietnam.

References

Eunidiini
Beetles described in 1932